The Great Redoubt, located in Saratoga National Historical Park in Saratoga, New York, was the probable burial place for British General Simon Fraser.

References

External links
 The Great Redoubt - New York State Military Museum

Buildings and structures in Saratoga County, New York